San Cristoforo Minore is a small former-Roman Catholic church or oratory located on the piazza Turi Ferro, formerly of Santo Spirito, near the center of the city of Catania, Sicily, southern Italy. It is putatively now the church of San Leone and owned by the Greek Orthodox parish of Catania, but is mostly closed. The church has a slender Baroque facade and sits on a forgotten, somewhat decrepit, urban island between streets. In the 18th century, the church as associated with a Catholic confraternity: the Congregazione Santissima Maria Addolorata.

References

 

Roman Catholic churches in Catania
18th-century churches in Italy
Baroque architecture in Catania
Baroque church buildings in Sicily